The Anantara Grand Hotel Krasnapolsky, often informally referred to as Kras, is a five-star hotel on Dam Square in central Amsterdam, Netherlands. Founded in 1865, the hotel has 451 rooms, a convention center, restaurants and a pier for boats on the Oudezijds Voorburgwal canal.

The original owner of the hotel, Adolph Wilhelm Krasnapolsky, purchased the building in 1865 and turned it into a popular restaurant in 1866. He also bought the adjacent buildings and added rooms between 1879 and 1880. During the same period, he built a conservatory with palm trees and cupola, designed by architect G.B. Salm, which was considered to be very modern for its time due to the use of glass, steel and electric lighting.

To mark the exhibition of 1883, he built the business into a hotel with 125 rooms. In the late 19th century, it was the only hotel in Amsterdam with hot water and telephones in each room. After World War I, more buildings were purchased and the hotel was extended to Pijlsteeg.

In 1971, the hotel was sold and in 1974, it became the Golden Tulip Hotel Krasnapolsky. In the 1990s, the owners purchased a series of hotels and restaurants at home and abroad, including the Amsterdam Doelen Hotel, Schiller Hotel and Caransa Hotel. In 1998, Krasnapolsky Hotels & Restaurants N.V. (KHR) bought the Golden Tulip, and in 2000 KHR was in turn bought by NH Hotel Group. The hotel was rebranded as NH Grand Hotel Krasnapolskuy and later NH Collection Grand Hotel Krasnapolsky. The hotel rebranded again on April 20, 2022, becoming Anantara Grand Hotel Krasnapolsky.

The hotel is referred to several times in the Swedish novel Socialisten by Ivar Lo-Johansson.

See also
Hotel Polen fire

References

External links

Anantara Grand Hotel Krasnapolsky official website
https://www.hospitality-management.nl/van-nh-naar-anantara-een-kijkje-in-het-nieuwe-krasnapolsky-amsterdam

Dam Square
Hotels in Amsterdam
Rijksmonuments in Amsterdam
Hotel buildings completed in 1883
Hotels established in 1866